James Carlton Hinebaugh Jr. (born December 12, 1946) is an American politician. He is a member of the Maryland House of Delegates for District 1A in Garrett and Allegany counties. He previously served as a member of the Garrett County Board of Commissioners, representing District 3 from 2014 to 2022.

Background
James Carlton Hinebaugh Jr. graduated from Southern Garrett High School. He graduated from the University of Southern Mississippi in 1974 with a Bachelor of Science in computer science and mathematics. In 1988, Hinebaugh graduated from Shippensburg University of Pennsylvania with a Master of Business Administration degree in public administration.

In 1966, Hinebaugh was activated in the United States Army and was deployed overseas for eight years, including service in Vietnam. He retired as a colonel in 1995.

In August 1995, Hinebaugh was appointed Director of the Garrett County Department of Economic Development. During his tenure, the department experienced numerous business expansions, a decrease in the unemployment rate from 13.7 percent in 1997 to 7.5 percent in 2011, and the creation of six industrial parks. He also helped establish the Garrett County Scholarships Program in 2006, which provides two years of free tuition at Garrett College to county high school graduates. He retired from this position on October 1, 2012.

In 2014, Hinebaugh ran for the Garrett County Board of Commissioners in District 3, challenging incumbent commissioner Bob Gatto. He defeated Gatto in the Republican primary, receiving 36.8 percent of the vote to Gatto's 33.3 percent. He won the general election with 47.7 percent of the vote.

Garrett County Commissioner
Hinebaugh was sworn in as a member of the Garrett County Board of Commissioners on December 9, 2014. He won re-election to a second term in 2018.

In January 2019, Hinebaugh was elected an one-year term the Maryland Association of Counties board of directors. In December 2021, Hinebaugh was named to serve on the association's executive board.

In 2022, Hinebaugh filed to run for the Maryland House of Delegates in District 1A, seeking to succeed retiring state delegate Wendell R. Beitzel. He won the Republican primary on July 19, 2022, receiving 58.5 percent of the vote, and later won the general election on November 8.

In the legislature
Hinebaugh was sworn into the Maryland House of Delegates on January 11, 2023. He is a member of the House Appropriations Committee.

Personal life
Hinebaugh is married to his wife Barbara. Together, they have two children, and live in Oakland, Maryland.

Decorations and badges 
Hinebaugh's decorations and medals include:

Electoral history

References

External links
 

21st-century American politicians
1946 births
Living people
People from Garrett County, Maryland
Republican Party members of the Maryland House of Delegates
Shippensburg University of Pennsylvania alumni
United States Army personnel of the Vietnam War
University of Southern Mississippi alumni
County commissioners in Maryland
Military personnel from Maryland